Jaron Long (born August 28, 1991) is an American professional baseball pitcher who is a free agent. Prior to playing professionally, Long played college baseball for Chandler-Gilbert Community College and Ohio State University.

Career
Long attended Cactus Shadows High School in Cave Creek, Arizona. He played baseball as a pitcher and an infielder, but did not make his school's varsity team until he was a senior. In 2010, The Arizona Republic named Long as an honorable mention on their All-Class 4A baseball team. No colleges in the National Collegiate Athletic Association's Division I offered him a scholarship. After he graduated, Long enrolled at Chandler–Gilbert Community College, and played college baseball for the Chandler–Gilbert Coyotes. As a freshman, Long pitched to a 1.62 earned run average (ERA) in 50 innings, though a broken wrist ended his season prematurely. After he recovered, he participated in collegiate summer baseball, playing for the East Texas Pumpjacks of the Texas Collegiate League.

After his freshman year, he transferred to Ohio State University to play for the Ohio State Buckeyes baseball team, a Division I program. Long began his Buckeyes career as a relief pitcher, but was moved into the starting rotation. As a sophomore, Long led the Buckeyes with a 2.66 ERA, the sixth-best ERA among pitchers in the Big Ten Conference, and the fourth most innings pitched. Long was named to the All-Big Ten's first team. That summer, he played for the Bourne Braves of the Cape Cod Baseball League. In his junior year, Long developed warts on his pitching hand, which prevented him from throwing his changeup. He had a 4.02 ERA, and went undrafted in the 2013 MLB Draft. Pitching again for the Bourne Braves in the summer of 2013, he was named a league all-star and his 0.30 ERA led the league. New York Yankees' amateur scouting director Damon Oppenheimer noticed Long and in August 2013, Long signed with the Yankees as an undrafted free agent.

After Long signed with the Yankees, he appeared in six games as a relief pitcher with the Gulf Coast Yankees of the Rookie-level Gulf Coast League and Tampa Yankees of the Class A-Advanced Florida State League at the end of the 2013 season. In 2014, he reported to spring training, and was assigned to the Charleston RiverDogs of the Class A South Atlantic League. In 11 appearances, which included four games started, Long had a 1.64 ERA for Charleston. For the week of May 26 – June 1, he was named the league's Pitcher of the Week. On June 5, he was promoted to Tampa. After six appearances for Tampa, in which he compiled a 2.77 ERA, he was promoted to the Trenton Thunder of the Class AA Eastern League. Over the whole season, Long pitched in 28 games (18 starts) and had a 12-5 record, 2.18 ERA, 122 strikeouts, 22 walks, and a shutout in 144.1 innings pitched.

Long was released by the Yankees in April 2016. He signed a minor league deal with the Washington Nationals and spent the 2016 season pitching for the Nationals' AA and AAA clubs. He finished the 2016 season with a 5-6 record and a 3.20 ERA. On November 27, 2017, Long resigned a minor league deal with the Nationals, who invited him to spring training. He elected free agency on November 2, 2018.

On December 14, 2018, Long signed a minor league deal with the Arizona Diamondbacks. He was released on March 21, 2019.

Jaron is currently a Certified Major League Baseball Player Agent for Scott Boras Corporation.

Personal life
Long is the youngest of three children. His father, Kevin Long, is the current hitting coach of the Philadelphia Phillies and former hitting coach of the Washington Nationals, New York Yankees and New York Mets. Kevin, who then was playing and coaching in the minor leagues, insisted that his son not pitch while he was young or throw a breaking ball until he was 16 years old. As a teenager, Long served as a batboy for the Yankees.

Long returned to Ohio State to graduate in December 2013.

References

External links

1991 births
Living people
Baseball players from Scottsdale, Arizona
Baseball pitchers
Chandler–Gilbert Coyotes baseball players
Ohio State Buckeyes baseball players
Bourne Braves players
Gulf Coast Yankees players
Tampa Yankees players
Charleston RiverDogs players
Trenton Thunder players
Scranton/Wilkes-Barre RailRiders players
Harrisburg Senators players
Syracuse Chiefs players